Spivs is a 2004 British crime film directed by Colin Teague, who also co-wrote the screenplay along with screenwriters Gary Young, and Mike Loveday. It is the second of three undertakings by Teague and Young, the others being Shooters and The Last Drop, respectively. Incidentally, director Glenn Durfort, who worked with Teague on Shooters, appears briefly in all three of these films.

Plot summary 
Jack, Steve and Goat are East End London "spivs" (British slang for a black marketeer) who spend their days wheeling and dealing whenever and wherever they can. But not until they are landed with the juicy payoff they have been waiting for, involving a shady character who calls himself Villa, do they realize the trouble they have got into. After opening a truck door they discover they were not smuggling merchandise, rather they were smuggling people.  The people run out of the cargo area.  Jack is mad at Steve for not checking.  Then suddenly they discover two small Albanian children a girl and a boy. Now they are in even more trouble.

Cast

References

External links 
 
 
 

Albanian-language films
2004 films
British crime comedy-drama films
2000s crime comedy-drama films
Films scored by David Julyan
2000s English-language films
2000s British films